The Basildon Academies is a secondary school in Basildon, Essex, England.

The Academies
The Academies are situated across two sites: the Lower Academy (for 11 to 14-year-olds) and the Upper Academy (for 14 to 19-year-olds). There is a Sixth Form on the Upper Academy site.
The Academies opened in 2009, under the sponsorship of The Stanton Lane Educational Trust. Both Academies are housed in modern buildings.

Curriculum and exam results
Since 2012, The Basildon Academies curriculum has been expanded to cater for a wider range of interests and competences. This includes the introduction of Latin, along with a number of vocational courses at both GCSE and A Level.
In 2012 Basildon Academies received a Warning Letter from Lord Hill at the Department for Education because of the "unacceptably low" standards. The Upper Academy's GCSE results for 2013 continued a four-year trend of improvement, with the proportion of students achieving 5 or more A*-C grades (including English and Maths) rising to 46%, demonstrating an increase of 25 percentage points since 2009. This confirmed the Academies as the second best-performing school in Basildon at that point in time.

In 2012 there was an increase in demand for Sixth Form places.
A Level results in 2013 also showed improvement on the previous year: the percentage of students gaining 3 or more A Levels (including equivalent BTEC qualifications), with all students securing 3 or more A Levels being offered a place at their first-choice university. In 2015 A level results showed that the 35 A level students obtained an average of a D grade.

Ofsted
In November 2015, both the Lower and Upper Academies were inspected by Ofsted. Recognising the improvements made since the previous visits, inspectors rated both Academies ‘Good’ for leadership and management and behaviour and safety of students, and removed both Lower and Upper from special measures. They noted that achievement has shown continued progression, with ambitious targets ensuring that these improvements will be sustained over the coming years.

Sixth Form
The Sixth Form is located on the Upper Academy site, and provides both academic and vocational qualifications to students. Dedicated Sixth Form facilities provide students with their own space within the Upper Academy building, and the sponsor provides work experience opportunities and visits to universities.

References

Borough of Basildon
Secondary schools in Essex
Educational institutions established in 2009
Academies in Essex
2009 establishments in England